Seller's Standard Station and Pullman Diner is a historic service station and diner complex located at Morocco, Newton County, Indiana.  The Pullman diner was built in 1930, and expanded about 1935 with the service station addition.  A two-story service bay was added in 1940, a large room about 1955, and a large drive-in garage in 1966.  The original buildings are representative of two vernacular structures with Bungalow / American Craftsman style design elements.  The complex provided essential services along the former route of U.S. Route 41.

It was listed on the National Register of Historic Places in 2014.

References

Commercial buildings on the National Register of Historic Places in Indiana
Bungalow architecture in Indiana
Houses completed in 1935
Buildings and structures in Newton County, Indiana
National Register of Historic Places in Newton County, Indiana
Gas stations on the National Register of Historic Places in Indiana
Transportation buildings and structures in Newton County, Indiana